Short History of the World may refer to:

 A Short History of the World, 1997 book by J. M. Roberts, a follow-up to his larger 1994 book History of the World
A Short History of the World (Blainey book), 2000 book by Geoffrey Blainey
A Short History of the World (Wells book), 1922 book by H. G. Wells
The Short Oxford History of the Modern World, book series published by the Oxford University Press

See also
A Little History of the World, 1935 book by Vienna native Ernst Gombrich
History of the World (book), 1944 edited by English historian W. N. Weech